The Florida Strikers were a soccer team based in Fort Lauderdale, Florida. In 1994, they began play in the United States Interregional Soccer League as the Fort Lauderdale Kicks. The next year, with the folding of the American Professional Soccer League Strikers, the Kicks took the name Fort Lauderdale Strikers for themselves.  This only lasted one year as the team changed names again, becoming the Florida Strikers before the 1996 season. The team folded in 1997.

Year-by-year

See also
Fort Lauderdale Strikers (1977-1983)
Fort Lauderdale Sun Division 2 team of the short-lived USL (1984–85)
Fort Lauderdale Strikers (1988-1994)
Miami Fusion Now defunct MLS team (1997–2001)
Fort Lauderdale Strikers (2006–2016) (formerly Miami FC) former Division 2 team which competed in the NASL

 
1994 establishments in Florida
1997 disestablishments in Florida
Soccer clubs in Florida
Defunct soccer clubs in Florida
Association football clubs established in 1994
Association football clubs disestablished in 1997